Cathala is a surname. Notable people with the surname include:

Frédéric Cathala (born 1962), French author
Jean Cathala, French singer, composer, and cornettist
Laurent Cathala (born 1945), French politician
Pierre Cathala (1888–1947), French Minister of Finance from 1942 to 1944